The 1957 Mississippi Southern Southerners football team was an American football team that represented Mississippi Southern College (now known as the University of Southern Mississippi) as an independent during the 1957 NCAA College Division football season. In their ninth year under head coach Thad Vann, the team compiled a 8–3 record.

Schedule

References

Mississippi Southern
Southern Miss Golden Eagles football seasons
Mississippi Southern Southerners football